This list of Heritage New Zealand-listed places in Hokitika contains those buildings and structures that are listed with Heritage New Zealand (formerly known as Historic Places Trust) in Hokitika, New Zealand.

Heritage New Zealand is a Crown entity and the national heritage agency. With a head office in Wellington, the Christchurch area office is responsible for the West Coast region, which includes Hokitika.

References 

History of the West Coast, New Zealand
Hokitika